Sherri Wood (1979 – March 24, 2008) was a Canadian journalist for the Toronto Sun. An Etobicoke, Ontario native, Wood worked for the Sun since 2004 as an entertainment reporter and critic. She also had a weekly spot on Canoe Live, SUN TV's current-affairs show. The last story Wood wrote for the Sun was on April 15, 2007, a review of a concert by Brooklyn indie-rock troupe Clap Your Hands Say Yeah. Within hours of filing, she collapsed suddenly and was rushed to hospital.

Death

On March 24, 2008 Wood died of brain cancer after an 11-month battle. Several tributes were posted by her former colleagues including Sun writers Bill Harris and Kathy Brooks and several others. Her sister Kayla Wood also posted tributes.

References

1980 births
2008 deaths
Canadian newspaper journalists
Canadian women journalists
Deaths from brain cancer in Canada
Journalists from Toronto
People from Etobicoke
Writers from Toronto
Canadian women non-fiction writers